Hikoroku Arimoto (有本 彦六; October 11, 1915 – May 1945) was a Japanese artistic gymnast. He competed at the 1936 Summer Olympics and finished ninth with the Japanese team. His best individual result was 35th place on the floor. He died in World War II.

References

1915 births
1945 deaths
Gymnasts at the 1936 Summer Olympics
Olympic gymnasts of Japan
Japanese male artistic gymnasts
Japanese military personnel killed in World War II
Japanese military personnel of World War II
20th-century Japanese people